Afshar District is in Khodabandeh County, Zanjan province, Iran. At the 2006 National Census, its population was 16,304 in 3,545 households. The following census in 2011 counted 15,303 people in 3,920 households. At the latest census in 2016, the district had 12,424 inhabitants in 3,407 households. The majority population is Azeri followed by Persians.

References 

Khodabandeh County

Districts of Zanjan Province

Populated places in Zanjan Province

Populated places in Khodabandeh County